= Bar Thana =

- Union Council
- Country: Pakistan
- Province: Khyber Pakhtunkhwa
- District: Swat

Population (2017)
  - Total: 22,890
- Time zone: UTC+5 (PST)

BarThana is an administrative unit, known as Union council, of Swat District in the Khyber Pakhtunkhwa province of Pakistan. District Swat has 9 Tehsils i.e. Khwazakhela, Kabal, Madyan, Barikot, Mingora, and Kalam. Each Tehsill comprises certain numbers of union councils. There are 65 union councils in district Swat, 56 rural and 09 urban.

== See also ==
- Swat District
